DXMA (104.1 FM), broadcasting as Wow Radio 104.1, is an FM station owned and operated by Polytechnic Foundation of Cotabato and Asia. The station's studio is located along Sto. Niño St., Brgy. Poblacion 1, Midsayap.

Last August 7, 2013, a blast occurred near the building where the station is located.

References

Radio stations in Cotabato
Radio stations established in 2003